Belmont 112 , also known as the Belmont Program, was a project attacking poverty in Philadelphia.  In 1987, philanthropist George Weiss began supporting 112 sixth-grade  girls and boys from  Belmont Elementary School in West Philadelphia.  He guaranteed them that  he would pay for their education through college if they met some conditions.  The conditions were  that they did not use drugs, commit any crimes or have children unless they were married. In addition to paying for their college educations, Weiss's program supported the children by giving them tutors, counselors, after-school programs, and medical and dental care.

The program was the first one of Weiss's Say Yes to Education, Inc. efforts.  Say Yes is a nonprofit set up to improve inner-city education. The results were that twenty graduated from college but 45 did not finish high school. In addition, twenty were convicted of crimes, and more than half of the girls had babies by the time they were eighteen years old. John McWhorter calls this a failure due to not considering cultural factors.

References

Non-profit organizations based in Philadelphia
Educational charities based in the United States